The Tanana Mission (also known as Mission of Our Saviour; Episcopal Mission) was a historic Episcopal church mission in Tanana, Alaska.  Its abandoned church building and cemetery are listed on the U.S. National Register of Historic Places.

It was deemed significant as artifacts of the once-large Episcopal mission, which additionally includeda hospital, a sawmill, a rectory, and a school.  It is located about 3 miles up from the current Tanana village location.  It was deemed "important to the history of interior Alaska as a place where permanent native (Indian) community was established near the mission which located itself opposite the prehistoric trading center of many interior Athapaskan Indians - Nuchalawoyya" and also as representing "a place where native people learned and participated in the activities of a foreign culture", and as a burial site, and as for the architecture of its church.

The church building has multiple gables above a  plan.  It was built in 1899 and added to the National Register in 1977.

See also
National Register of Historic Places listings in Yukon–Koyukuk Census Area, Alaska

References

Buildings and structures in Yukon–Koyukuk Census Area, Alaska
Episcopal church buildings in Alaska
Churches on the National Register of Historic Places in Alaska
Churches completed in 1899
Yukon River
19th-century Episcopal church buildings
Historic districts on the National Register of Historic Places in Alaska
Buildings and structures on the National Register of Historic Places in Yukon–Koyukuk Census Area, Alaska